Tuscola may refer to:

Tuscola, Illinois
Tuscola Township, Douglas County, Illinois
Tuscola, Kentucky
Tuscola County, Michigan
Tuscola Township, Tuscola County, Michigan
Tuscola, Mississippi
Tuscola High School (Waynesville, NC)
Tuscola, Texas

Henry Schoolcraft neologisms